The Caulfield Sprint is a Melbourne Racing Club Group 2  Thoroughbred horse race held under open handicap conditions, for horses aged three years old and upwards, over a distance of 1000 metres, held at Caulfield Racecourse, Melbourne, Australia in October. Total prize money for the race is A$300,000.

History
The event is scheduled on the third day of the MRC Spring Carnival (Caulfield Cup Day).
After the champion sprinter Schillaci won this race in 1994, the following year the race was renamed after the thoroughbred to the Schillaci Stakes. The race was run from 1995 to 1999 under the new name but the following year the Victoria Amateur Turf Club made a decision to rename the Chirnside Stakes to the Schillaci Stakes. This event was run as the Mercedes-Benz Sprint in 2000.

Grade
 1983–1992 - Listed race
 1993–1998 - Group 3 
 1999 onwards - Group 2

Name
 1983–1984 - Racing Museum Sprint
 1985 - Brylcreem Sprint Championship
 1986 - National Sprint Championship
 1987–1991 - Caulfield Sprint
 1992 - Jupiter's Casino Sprint
 1993 - Conrad Jupiter's Sprint
 1994 - Caulfield Sprint
 1995–1999 - Schillaci Stakes
 2000–2001 - Mercedes-Benz Sprint
 2002 - National Telecoms Group Sprint
 2003–2005 - Dodo Internet Sprint
 2006–2009 - Thai Airways International Sprint
 2010 onwards - Caulfield Sprint

Distance
 1983–2014 – 1100 metres
 2015 onwards - 1000 metres

Winners

 2022 - Asfoora
 2021 - Oxley Road
 2020 - Graff
 2019 - Miss Leonidas
 2018 - Eduardo
 2017 - Snitty Kitty
 2016 - Our Boy Malachi
 2015 - † Eclair Choice / Lumosty
 2014 - † Miracles Of Life / Bel Sprinter
 2013 - Spirit Of Boom
 2012 - Howmuchdoyouloveme
 2011 - Sepoy
 2010 - Set For Fame
 2009 - First Command
 2008 - Sunburnt Land
 2007 - Tesbury Jack
 2006 - Biscayne Bay
 2005 - Jet Spur
 2004 - Lilando
 2003 - Blur
 2002 - Rubitano
 2001 - Windigo
 2000 - Camena
 1999 - Notoire
 1998 - Toledo
 1997 - Toledo
 1996 - Ruffles
 1995 - Petite Amour
 1994 - Schillaci
 1993 - Royal Discard
 1992 - Tanjian Prince
 1991 - Euclase
 1990 - Rise ‘N’ Shine
 1989 - Lonely Dreamer
 1988 - Rendoo
 1987 - Lord Scotia
 1986 - Bullion Broker
 1985 - Campaign King
 1984 - River Rough
 1983 - Bow Mistress

† Dead heat

See also
 List of Australian Group races
 Group races

References

Horse races in Australia
Open sprint category horse races
Caulfield Racecourse